James McPherson was a provincial level politician from Alberta, Canada. He served as a member of the Legislative Assembly of Alberta from 1982 to 1986 sitting with the governing Progressive Conservative caucus.

Political career
McPherson ran for a seat to the Legislative Assembly of Alberta in the 1982 Alberta general election. He won the electoral district of Red Deer defeating future Member of Parliament Bob Mills by a wide margin. McPherson retired from provincial politics at dissolution of the legislature in 1986 after serving a term in office.

References

External links
Legislative Assembly of Alberta Members Listing

Progressive Conservative Association of Alberta MLAs
Schulich School of Law alumni
Year of birth missing (living people)
Living people